Sumedh Mudgalkar (born 2 November 1996) is an Indian film and television actor, as well as a dancer.  He is best known for his work as Shushim in Chakravartin Ashoka Samrat, as Lord Krishna in RadhaKrishn and as Darkie in the Disney+ Hotstar series Escaype Live.

Career

Dancing 
He made his dance debut on a Marathi reality show, Dance Maharashtra Dance, in 2012 at the age of 15 and was one of the finalists. He appeared in Dance India Dance (Season 4) in 2013, where he reached the finals, finishing as 3rd runner-up.

Acting 
Mudgalkar made his acting debut in Channel V’s Dil Dosti Dance, a dance-based youth show where he portrayed the role of Raghavendra "Raghav" Pratap Singh. Then he became known for portraying the main antagonist Yuvraj Sushim in the Indian historical drama Chakravartin Ashoka Samrat. 

Sumedh next moved to the Marathi film industry with a cameo in the 2016 film Ventilator as Karan. He then appeared in Manjha, which was his first film as a main antagonist as well as lead actor, in which he portrayed the role of a psychopath named Vicky. In 2018, he played the role of Salil in Bucket List. Recently, he has also been shooting for the Marathi film Mann Yedyagat Zaala. In 2018, he featured in the Marathi music video Bekhabar Kashi Tu opposite Sanskruti Balgude.   

From October 2018 to January 2023, he played the role of Lord Krishna, Lord Vishnu and Lord Rama in Swastik Productions' television series RadhaKrishn on Star Bharat opposite Mallika Singh. In 2021, he reprised his role of Lord Vishnu along with Mallika Singh and Basant Bhatt in RadhaKrishn'''s prequel series Jai Kanhaiya Lal Ki which also aired on Star Bharat and ended in July 2022.

In 2022 he featured as Darkie in Disney+ Hotstar's web series Escaype Live produced and directed by Siddharth Kumar Tewary under Swastik Productions.

 Filmography 

 Films 

Television

 Special appearances 

 Web series 

 Music videos 

 Awards and nominations 

 Media image 
He was ranked in The Times of India'''s "Most Desirable Men of Maharashtra" at No. 17 in 2018, at No.15 in 2019, and at No. 6 in 2020.

References

External links 

 

Living people
1996 births
Male actors from Pune
Indian male dancers
Indian male film actors
Indian male television actors
Male actors in Marathi cinema
21st-century Indian male actors